Ramón López (born 6 June 1963) is a Paraguayan long-distance runner. He competed at the 1984 Summer Olympics and the 1988 Summer Olympics.

References

1963 births
Living people
Athletes (track and field) at the 1983 Pan American Games
Athletes (track and field) at the 1984 Summer Olympics
Athletes (track and field) at the 1988 Summer Olympics
Paraguayan male long-distance runners
Paraguayan male middle-distance runners
Paraguayan male steeplechase runners
Olympic athletes of Paraguay
Pan American Games competitors for Paraguay
World Athletics Championships athletes for Paraguay
Place of birth missing (living people)